Mõdriku-Roela Landscape Conservation Area is a nature park which is located in Lääne-Viru County, Estonia.

The protected area was founded in 1978 to protect Mõdriku-Roela Esker with Küti and Voore Springs and springlakes. In 1986, the protected area was designated to the landscape conservation area.

References

Nature reserves in Estonia
Geography of Lääne-Viru County